Samsung Galaxy On5 is an Android smartphone produced by Samsung Electronics. It was announced in October 2015 and released in November 2015.
It has a 32-bit Exynos 3475 Quad System on Chip (SoC) and 1.5GB of RAM.

The Galaxy On5 has an 8 megapixel rear camera with LED flash, f/2.2 aperture, auto-focus and has a front facing 5 megapixel 85-degree(85°) wide-angle camera, which can extend up to 120-degree(120°).

Specifications

Hardware
The phone has an Exynos 3475 Quad chipset which includes Quad-core 1.3 GHz Cortex-A7 processor, Mali-T720 GPU and 1.5GB RAM, with 8GB of internal storage and a battery of 2600 mAh. The Samsung Galaxy On5 has a 5-inch TFT capacitive touchscreen, 16M colors display, and 8 MP rear camera and 5 MP front camera.

Software

This phone was officially released with Android 6.0.1 Marshmallow as of March 24, 2017.

References 

Mobile phones introduced in 2015
Samsung Galaxy